Sarah Eberle is an English garden designer.

Life and work
Eberle grew up in Dartmoor, Devon.  Her father, Sir James Eberle  (1927–2018), was a British admiral.   She attended Thames Polytechnic, and qualified as a landscape architect in 1980.

Eberle has won over 19 gold medals at the RHS Chelsea Flower Show, the most of any exhibitor; a gold medal in every category there is in the show. Her Chelsea garden won 'Best in Show' in 2007 and 2017. She has won six Hampton Court Gold medals and in 2022 she was made an RHS Iconic Horticultural Hero.

Eberle is a member of Landscape Institute, the Society of Garden Designers and the Institute of Horticulture; she has an Honorary Doctorate in Design from Greenwich University. She is an RHS Associate of Honour (2016) and is a member of the RHS council (2018–2023). She was also named the British Association of Landscape Industries Grand Award winner in 2007. 

Eberle lives near Cole Henley, Whitchurch in Hampshire, with her husband, Robert Stevens, and three children.

Show gardens
designs include:
Toy Garden (1998)
For Whoever you are.... (2001)
Estuary Garden (2002)
Woodland Garden (2003)
A Woman's Sanctuary (2004)
Walking Barefoot (2006)
600 Days (2007)
Breast Cancer Haven Garden (2015) 
Beyond Our Borders  ((2015) 
Garden of Inspiration (2017)
Changing Moves Changing Minds (2018)
The Resilience Garden (2019)
Psalm 23 (2021)
Building the Future (2022)

References

Living people
Year of birth missing (living people)
People from Whitchurch, Hampshire
English gardeners